Sweden competed at the 2022 World Aquatics Championships in Budapest, Hungary from 18 June to 3 July.

Medalists

Artistic swimming 

Sweden entered 2 artistic swimmers.

Women

Diving

Sweden entered 3 divers.

Men

Women

Open water swimming

Sweden entered 1 open water male swimmers

Men

Swimming

Sweden entered 14 swimmers.
Men

Women

Mixed

References

Nations at the 2022 World Aquatics Championships
2022
World Aquatics Championships